Hyastenus is a genus of crabs in the family Epialtidae, subfamily Pisinae, containing the following extant species:

Hyastenus ambonensis Griffin & Tranter, 1986
Hyastenus aries (Latreille, 1825)
Hyastenus auctus Rathbun, 1916
Hyastenus biformis Rathbun, 1916
Hyastenus bispinosus Buitendijk, 1939
Hyastenus borradailei (Rathbun, 1907)
Hyastenus brachychirus Nobili, 1899
Hyastenus brevicornis Ortmann, 1894
Hyastenus brockii de Man, 1887
Hyastenus campbelli Griffin & Tranter, 1986
Hyastenus consobrinus A. Milne-Edwards, 1895
Hyastenus convexus Miers, 1884
Hyastenus cornigerus Sakai, 1938
Hyastenus cracentis Griffin & Tranter, 1986
Hyastenus diacanthus (De Haan, 1839)
Hyastenus elatus Griffin & Tranter, 1986
Hyastenus elongatus Ortmann, 1893
Hyastenus espinosus (Borradaile, 1903)
Hyastenus fracterculus Rathbun, 1916
Hyastenus gracilimanus Yang & Dai, 1994
Hyastenus hectori Miers, 1879
Hyastenus hendersoni (Laurie, 1906)
Hyastenus hilgendorfi de Man, 1887
Hyastenus inermis (Rathbun, 1911)
Hyastenus kyusyuensis (Yokoya, 1933)
Hyastenus mindoro Griffin & Tranter, 1986
Hyastenus minutus Buitendijk, 1939
Hyastenus planasius (Adams & White, 1848)
Hyastenus pleione (Herbst, 1803)
Hyastenus scrobiculatus Rathbun, 1916
Hyastenus sebae White, 1847
Hyastenus sinope (Adams & White, 1848)
Hyastenus spinosus A. Milne-Edwards, 1872
Hyastenus subinermis Zehntner, 1894
Hyastenus ternatensis Buitendijk, 1939
Hyastenus truncatipes (Miers, 1879)
Hyastenus uncifer Calman, 1900
Hyastenus whitei Griffin, 1976

One further fossil species is known.

References

Majoidea